The discography of Ice Cube, an American rapper, consists of ten studio albums, six compilation albums, one extended play, as well as twelve movie soundtracks.

Albums

Studio albums

Collaboration albums

Compilation albums

Extended plays

Soundtracks

Singles

Guest appearances

See also
 N.W.A. discography
 Da Lench Mob discography
 Westside Connection discography

References 

Hip hop discographies
Discography
Discographies of American artists